If a Body Meets a Body is a 1945 short subject directed by Jules White starring American slapstick comedy team The Three Stooges (Moe Howard, Larry Fine and Curly Howard). It is the 86th entry in the series released by Columbia Pictures starring the comedians, who released 190 shorts for the studio between 1934 and 1959.

Plot
The Stooges are unemployed, and looking through the want-ads for work. As the trio sets the table, Curly brings a pail of soup from a meat bone; Larry remarks that Curly's soup smells like a dead horse, and Moe finds a large horseshoe in the pail. The duo becomes angry with Curly about the fact that they "sent him to the butcher shop for meat, not to the glue factory", so they kick him out. As Curly was about to leave, Moe stumbles upon a newspaper article stating that Curly's uncle, Bob O. Link (Al Thompson), has died and left his nephew, Curly Q. Link, a large inheritance. Upon arriving at the uncle's mansion for the reading of the will, the lawyer in charge of the will disappears, along with the will itself; he is later found murdered. All potential heirs, including the Stooges, are held as suspects and forced to spend the night.

While getting a tour of their sleeping quarters, Curly gets spooked when it is revealed that he was standing on the exact spot his uncle was murdered. The rest of the night consists of various occurrences which frighten the Stooges, among them a parrot walking around inside a human skull, howling wind, and Link's corpse leaning on Moe.

In fright, the Stooges flee down a stairwell and knock over the maid (Joe Palma), who turns out to be the killer in disguise; he is discovered when his wig flies off during the collision, revealing the will, which was hidden underneath it. After excitedly reading the will, Curly learns that he has been bequeathed a grand total of $0.67 net while leaving Liza Link $1,250,000, much to their dismay.

Production notes
The film title is a pun on a line from the traditional Scottish song by Robert Burns, "Coming Through the Rye" (as in "Should a body meet a body/Coming through the rye/Should a body kiss a body/Need a body cry?"). The plot device is borrowed from The Laurel-Hardy Murder Case, which also features actor Fred Kelsey.

Curly Howard's decline
If a Body Meets a Body was filmed on March 9–13, 1945. It was the first film produced after Curly Howard suffered a mild stroke. As a result, his performance was marred by slurred speech and slower timing. Though the trio did not know it at the time, Curly's health would gradually deteriorate, resulting in languid, sickly performances through his final film with the Stooges, Half-Wits Holiday.

If a Body Meets a Body premiered the final version of "Three Blind Mice" as the Stooges' theme music, an updated rendition of "sliding strings" version previously used regularly from 1938's Flat Foot Stooges until 1942's What's the Matador?. This revamped version was arranged by John Leipold and Nico Grigor. Due to the timing of this theme's usage, it is often associated with the "ill Curly" period, as this revamped version coincidentally made its debut in the same film that Curly's illness became apparent. This version of "Three Blind Mice" would also be utilized for the first four shorts produced during the Shemp Howard era: Fright Night, Out West, Squareheads of the Round Table and The Hot Scots.

References

External links 
 
 
If a Body Meets a Body at threestooges.net

1945 films
1945 comedy films
The Three Stooges films
American black-and-white films
Films directed by Jules White
Columbia Pictures short films
American comedy short films
1940s English-language films
1940s American films